Oleksiy Oleksandrovych Kovtun (born 5 February 1995) is a Ukrainian professional football defender.

Career
Kovtun is a product of the FC Dynamo School System. As part of the Kievites, he spent four seasons in the youth football league. According to the results of the 2011/12 championship, he was recognized as the best defender of the U-17 tournament. After completing his studies for half a season, he played for the Kievites in the first ever Ukrainian Championship among 19-year-olds

Metalist Kharkiv
After which he continued his career in Metalist Kharkiv. He made his debut for FC Metalist in the match against FC Dynamo Kyiv on 1 March 2015 in the Ukrainian Premier League.

Poltava
At the end of August 2015 he moved to Poltava, in which he made his debut on August 30 in an away match against Dynamo-2, replacing Dmitry Shastal in the 46th minute of the meeting. On 27 May 2016 he scored away on the victory against Hirnyk-Sport Horishni Plavni in the season 2015–16 in Ukrainian First League. On 3 May 2017 he scored against Helios Kharkiv  in Ukrainian First League in the season 2015–16. On 21 September 2016 he scored in Ukrainian Cup against Zirka Kropyvnytskyi and on 26 October 2016 against Karpaty Lviv in the season 2016-17.

Karpaty Lviv
In summer 2018 he moved from  FC Minsk to Karpaty Lviv in Ukrainian Premier League.

Rukh Brest
In 2020 he moved to Rukh Brest, in Belarusian Premier League, where in the season 2020 Belarusian Premier League, he got 8th place in the league with the team and played 17 games scoring 1 goal against Dinamo Minsk giving the victory for 0–1 away for Rukh Brest at Traktor Stadium.

Mynai
On 21 January 2021 he moved from Rukh Brest to Mynai in Ukrainian Premier League where he played 4 games.

Desna Chernihiv
In September 2021 he moved to Desna Chernihiv the first team of Chernihiv in Ukrainian Premier League. The club took Kovtun  in order to reinforce the defense. Kovtun will perform with six number and the details of the contract are not reported. On 12 September 2021 he made his debit against Vorskla Poltava at the Butovsky Vorskla Stadium replacing Serhiy Bolbat at the 89 minute. On 21 September 2021 he played against Metalist Kharkiv in Ukrainian Cup in the season 2021-22. On 15 November 2021 he played against Olimpik Donetsk in the friendly match at the Bannikov Stadium in Kyiv. In January 2022, he ended his contract with the club of Chernihiv.

National Team
On May 16, 2015, it became a potential warehouse of Ukraine U20, which will go viral until New Zealand, and it will be available before the match in the championship of the world.

Career statistics

Club

References

External links
 Profile on Official FC Desna Chernihiv website
 
 
 

1995 births
Living people
Footballers from Kyiv
Ukrainian footballers
Association football defenders
Ukrainian Premier League players
Ukraine youth international footballers
Ukrainian expatriate footballers
Ukrainian expatriate sportspeople in Belarus
Expatriate footballers in Belarus
FC Dynamo Kyiv players
FC Metalist Kharkiv players
FC Poltava players
FC Minsk players
FC Karpaty Lviv players
FC Rukh Brest players
FC Mynai players
FC Desna Chernihiv players